Stevčo Jakimovski (Macedonian: Стевчо Јакимовски, born 27 August 1960) is a Macedonian politician and leader of the Citizen Option for Macedonia, a political party he founded in 2013. He is a mayor of the Karpoš Municipality and a former member of the Social Democratic Union.

References

1960 births
Macedonian politicians
Living people